The Bayan Har Mountains, formerly known as the Bayen-káras or Bayan-Kara-Ula, are a mountain range in Qinghai Province, northwest China. The name is Mongolian for "Rich and Black". It can be viewed as one of the  branches of the Kunlun Mountains. It separates the drainage areas of both the Yellow and the Yangtze rivers. The source of the Yellow River is in the basin of Yueguzonglie, which is located in the northern part of the range.

Notes

References

External links

Mountain ranges of China
Landforms of Qinghai
Mountain ranges of Sichuan